Nereo C. Andolong, also known by his nickname Nering, was a Filipino official, journalist, activist and sports executive.

Andolong served as chairman and general manager of the Philippine Charity Sweepstakes Office. As a journalist, he advocated community journalism and promoted the concerns of province-based journalists. He also served as president of the National Press Club of the Philippines. He also served as a reporter for Manila Chronicle and was awarded the NPC-Stanvac journalism award in 1958 for his work with the media outfit. He also held the rank of colonel at the Philippine Constabulary.

He led various national sports associations such as the Philippine Bowling Congress and later became the president of the Philippine Olympic Committee from 1977 to 1980. He was a sportsman himself playing various sports including bowling, golf, pistol-shooting, sky diving scuba-diving, tennis, and water skiing

Andolong retired in the 1980s but remains an enthusiast in golf and other sports. He died at age 74 due to a lingering illness on October 31, 2001 and his remains were interred at the Manila Memorial Park – Sucat in Parañaque.

Andolong received a posthumous award along with seven other sports personalities on January 11, 2002 at the 2001 PSA Annual Awards.

References

2001 deaths
Filipino activists
Filipino journalists
Filipino sports executives and administrators
Filipino military leaders
Burials at the Manila Memorial Park – Sucat